Basic Creek is a stream in the U.S. state of New York.

The name "Basic" is possibly derived from the Mahican language, meaning "stone".

See also
Basic Creek Reservoir

References

Rivers of Albany County, New York
Rivers of Greene County, New York
Rivers of New York (state)